O'Byrne is an Irish surname. The O'Byrne family were descendants of Bran mac Máelmórda, King of Leinster.

People with the surname
Brían F. O'Byrne (b. 1967), Irish actor
Bryan O'Byrne (1931-2009), American actor
Cathal O'Byrne (1867-1957), Irish singer, poet and writer
Charles J. O'Byrne (b. 1959), American lawyer
David O'Byrne (b. 1969), Australian trade unionist and politician
Emmett O'Byrne (b. 1973), Irish historian
Fergus O'Byrne, Irish-Canadian folk musician
Fiach McHugh O'Byrne (1534-1597), Gaelic chieftain famed for his resistance to English rule in Ireland
Felim McFiach O'Byrne (d.1630), Gaelic chieftain
Gay Byrne (b. 1934), Irish radio and television presenter
John O'Byrne (1884-1954), Attorney General of the Irish free state
Justin O'Byrne (1912-1993), Australian politician
Michelle O'Byrne (b. 1968), member of the Tasmanian House of Assembly
 Patrick O'Byrne (pianist) (b. 1954), New Zealand pianist
 Patrick O'Byrne (politician)
Ryan O'Byrne (b. 1984), Canadian ice hockey player
William O'Byrne (1908-1951), English cricketer
William Richard O'Byrne (1823-1896), Irish biographer
Surnames